Stefan Osiecki (23 February 1902 – 7 May 1977) was a Polish painter. His work was part of the painting event in the art competition at the 1932 Summer Olympics.

References

1902 births
1977 deaths
20th-century German painters
20th-century German male artists
Polish painters
Polish male painters
Olympic competitors in art competitions
Artists from Warsaw